"Immortality" is a pop song recorded by Canadian singer Celine Dion for her fifth English-language studio album, Let's Talk About Love (1997). It was written by the Bee Gees, who also recorded backing vocals. Produced by Walter Afanasieff, "Immortality" was released as a single on 5 June 1998, outside the United States. It became a top ten single in Europe and a top forty single in Canada and Australia. Later, "Immortality" was included on the international editions of Dion's greatest hits albums, All the Way... A Decade of Song (1999), My Love: Essential Collection (2008) and The Best So Far... 2018 Tour Edition (2018).

Background and release
The Bee Gees wrote "Immortality" in 1996 for the Saturday Night Fever stage musical, which opened in May 1998. Dion recorded the song in June 1997 and the Bee Gees did the backing vocals on 18 August 1997. She attended their session, which was recorded for the music video. "Immortality" was produced by Walter Afanasieff and included on Dion's fifth English-language studio album, Let's Talk About Love in November 1997. It was released as a single in June 1998, outside the United States. The 1996 demo of "Immortality", in which Barry Gibb sings in falsetto to be in Dion's range, was released in November 2001 on Bee Gees' album, Their Greatest Hits: The Record. The Saturday Night Fever: Original Cast Recording album, released in June 1999, features the song performed by Adam Garcia. Dion's "Immortality" single released in Europe and Australia included mainly remixes of her previous hit, "My Heart Will Go On". In Brazil, "Immortality" served as a theme song to the primetime telenovela, Torre de Babel. The promotional single released in Brazil included remixes of "Immortality" by DJ Cuca.

Critical reception
Pip Ellwood-Hughes from Entertainment Focus described the song as a "power ballad", adding that Dion and Bee Gee's voices together on the song "works well". Entertainment Weekly editor David Browne called it "banal" and said that it is "flimsy concoction that droops under the weight of its arrangement". The New York Observer editor Jonathan Bernstein called this collaboration "dispiriting". Øyvin Søraa from Oppland Arbeiderblad called it "one of the most striking" songs of the Let's Talk About Love album. Bob Waliszewski of Plugged In noted that it celebrates love and "its ability to inspire eternal romantic devotion". Christopher Smith from TalkAboutPopMusic described the song as a "smoothie", adding that "it has all the epic flare and charm of a Celine ballad but with added Bee-Gee high notes in the background".

Commercial performance
"Immortality" was commercially successful in Europe, reaching number two in Germany and Austria, number five in the United Kingdom, number eight in Switzerland and Iceland, number eleven in Ireland, number twelve in Sweden, number fifteen in France and Belgium, and number twenty-eight in the Netherlands. On the European Hot 100 Singles, "Immortality" peaked at number four. It was certified Platinum in Germany, Gold in Sweden, and France. And Silver in the UK.  In Australia, the song reached number thirty-eight. In Canada, "Immortality" was released as a promotional single and topped the Adult Contemporary chart for two weeks. It also reached number twenty-eight on the Canadian Top Singles chart, based on airplay.

Music video
Filmed on 18 August 1997 and directed by Scott Lochmus, the first music video shows Dion and Bee Gees in the recording studio. In 1999, it was included on the Au cœur du stade DVD, as part of the bonus features, showing the recording process of Let's Talk About Love. The second music video, directed by Randee St. Nicholas, was filmed in July 1998 and released on 6 August 1998. This more elaborate video deals with themes of love, loss and reincarnation, with a cameo from the Bee Gees themselves. It opens with Dion walking through a graveyard. She and the Bee Gees then appear as ghosts in a manor house where Dion meets a man, presumably her lover. Dion and the Bee Gees later appear at a club where she is a singer. The video then ends in the graveyard where Dion walks away.

Live performances
On 14 November 1997, Dion performed "Immortality" with the Bee Gees at the MGM Grand Las Vegas. It was included on their live album and DVD, One Night Only, released in September 1998. In the first week of June 1998, Dion and the Bee Gees taped the performances of "Immortality" on three television shows: Top of the Pops in the United Kingdom, Hit Machine in France and Geld oder Liebe in Germany, for a later broadcast. Dion also performed the song during the Let's Talk About Love World Tour in 1998 and 1999, and in her residency show, Celine, between 2015 and 2017. On 16 April 2017, CBS aired Stayin’ Alive: A Grammy Salute to the Music of the Bee Gees, taped two months earlier, which included Dion performing "Immortality" as a tribute to the Bee Gees.

Formats and track listings

 Australian CD single
 "Immortality" – 4:11
 "To Love You More" – 5:20
 "My Heart Will Go On" (Richie Jones mix) – 4:15
 "My Heart Will Go On" (Tony Moran mix) – 4:21

 European CD single
 "Immortality" – 4:11
 "My Heart Will Go On" (Tony Moran mix) – 4:21

 European CD maxi-single
 "Immortality" – 4:11
 "My Heart Will Go On" – 4:40
 "My Heart Will Go On" (Tony Moran's Anthem vocal) – 9:41
 "My Heart Will Go On" (Soul Solution Percappella) – 4:16

 European 12-inch single
 "Immortality" – 4:11
 "My Heart Will Go On" (Tony Moran mix) – 4:15
 "My Heart Will Go On" (Tony Moran's Anthem vocal) – 9:41
 "My Heart Will Go On" (Matt & Vito's Unsinkable Epic mix) – 9:51

 Japanese CD single
 "Immortality" – 4:12
 "Where Is the Love" – 4:56

 UK cassette single
 "Immortality" – 4:11
 "My Heart Will Go On" (Soul Solution mix) – 4:18

 UK CD single
 "Immortality" – 4:11
 "My Heart Will Go On" (Tony Moran mix) – 4:20
 "My Heart Will Go On" (Richie Jones mix) – 4:16

 UK CD single 2
 "Immortality" – 4:11
 "To Love You More" – 5:28
 "(You Make Me Feel Like A) Natural Woman" – 3:41

Charts

Weekly charts

Year-end charts

Certifications and sales

Release history

See also
List of UK top 10 singles in 1998

References

1997 songs
1998 singles
1990s ballads
Bee Gees songs
Celine Dion songs
Columbia Records singles
Epic Records singles
Music videos directed by Randee St. Nicholas
Pop ballads
Song recordings produced by Walter Afanasieff
Songs written by Barry Gibb
Songs written by Maurice Gibb
Songs written by Robin Gibb